The 2013–14 Arkansas–Pine Bluff Golden Lions men's basketball team represented the University of Arkansas at Pine Bluff during the 2013–14 NCAA Division I men's basketball season. The Golden Lions, led by sixth year head coach George Ivory, played their home games at the K. L. Johnson Complex and were members of the Southwestern Athletic Conference. They finished the season 13–18, 11–7 in SWAC play to finish in fourth place. They lost in the quarterfinals of the SWAC tournament to Alabama A&M.

Roster

Schedule

|-
!colspan=9 style="background:#000000; color:#FFD700;"| Regular season

|-
!colspan=9 style="background:#000000; color:#FFD700;"| SWAC tournament

References

Arkansas–Pine Bluff Golden Lions men's basketball seasons
Arkansas-Pine Bluff
Arkansas-Pine Bluff Golden Lions men's basketball
Arkansas-Pine Bluff Golden Lions men's basketball